José Miguel Barriga Castro (Los Andes, Chile, June 14, 1816 – September 3, 1886) was a Chilean lawyer, politician and surveyor. He was the son of Don Juan Agustín Barriga and Margarita Castro. On May 24, 1844, he married Trinidad Espinoza Plaza de los Reyes in Cauquenes.

Education
He began his studies in his hometown and later moved to Santiago, where he studied at the National Institute. He was admitted to the bar on May 3, 1837. He then began his surveying studies, which concluded in 1839.

Professional career
José Miguel Barriga Castro served first as a teacher at the National Institute, a position he held until 1842, when he became judge of Cauquenes. His good work made him move up quickly. In 1847 he was appointed Governor of Maule, developing a comprehensive work of social progress.

Castro was the founding Minister of the Concepción Court (1849) and Minister of the Santiago Court of Appeals (1852). He joined the Civil Code Revision Commission to draft Andres Bello in 1855. That same year he was named Minister of the Supreme Court and in 1857 president of the national Supreme Court of Justice.

Political career

José Miguel Barriga Castro was a member of the Liberal Party. He was elected Member of Parliament for San Felipe (1855-1858), for Petorca (1858-1861) and for Linares (1861-1864). During this time he integrated the Standing Committee on Constitution, Law and Justice, and also the Standing Committee on Finance and Industry. He was Vice President of the House of Representatives (1858). He was again selected President of the Supreme Court of Justice (1877-1883).

Castro retired to live in his private residence until his death on September 3, 1886.

References 

1816 births
1886 deaths
People from Los Andes Province, Chile
Chilean people of Spanish descent
Liberal Party (Chile, 1849) politicians
Members of the Chamber of Deputies of Chile
Instituto Nacional General José Miguel Carrera alumni
19th-century Chilean lawyers
19th-century Chilean politicians